Pottassery-II is a village in the Palakkad district, state of Kerala, India. It is administered by the Tachampara gram panchayat and the Kanjirampuzha gram panchayat. The village contains the places of Mundakkunnu, Kanjiram, and Pottassery.

Demographics
 India census, Pottassery-II had a population of 10,246 with 4,979 males and 5,267 females.

References

Pottassery-II